Llanddeiniolen is the name of a community area, in the county of Gwynedd, Wales, and is  from Cardiff and  from London. It comprises the hamlet also called Llanddeiniolen, and the villages of Deiniolen, Bethel, Dinorwig, Rhiwlas, Brynrefail and Penisarwaun. It is the third-largest community by population in Gwynedd, with 5072 people in the 2011 census. Also in the community is the dispersed settlement of Fachwen, located on the north shore of Llyn Padarn. The name derives from the Welsh saint Deiniol (died 584).

Castell
Castell Llanddeiniolen, some 900m west of Rhiwlas, is a hill of glacial drift whose sides have been dug away to give a steeper slope. It has been identified as a Norman motte but is not a typical one. It may be a medieval ringwork – approximately, a motte and bailey without a motte – but may also be a small Iron Age fort.

Dinas Dinorwig
The hill-fort Dinas Dinorwig, enclosing about a hectare of land, lies 1km south-east of the hamlet centre and 3.5km from the Menai Strait. It has an inner wall, surrounded by two massive ramparts of earth and rubble, surrounded in turn by a ditch some 4 metres wide.

It is thought that it was part of the territory of the Ordovices tribe, and the element -orwig, -orweg has been derived from the tribal name Ordovices; although this idea was rejected by the linguist Melville Richards for lack of a sufficiently early record of a form *Orddwig..

In 77 CE, at some unknown location in the territory of the Ordovices, the Roman governor Agricola led his troops up a hill to a decisive victory. He collected a force of veterans and a small body of auxiliaries; then as the Ordovices would not venture to descend into the plain, he put himself in front of the ranks to inspire all with the same courage against a common danger, and led his troops up a hill. The tribe was all but exterminated. He went on to conquer Anglesey, sending cavalry recruited in other parts of Britain swimming over the Menai Strait before the defenders of Anglesey were ready.

See also
List of localities in Wales by population

References

External links
 

Llanddeiniolen
Communities in Gwynedd